The 97th Regiment, Indiana Volunteer Infantry was an infantry regiment that served in the Union Army during the American Civil War.  Organized in southwestern Indiana in 1862, the regiment saw action throughout the South at the siege of Vicksburg, the Battle of Atlanta and Sherman's March to the Sea.  They were mustered out June 9, 1865, in Washington, D.C. after a victorious parade through Washington.

Engagements
Battle of Griswoldville
Battle of Bentonville
Battle of Vicksburg
Battle of Chattanooga
Battle of Noonday Creek
Battle of Atlanta
Sherman's March to the Sea
Carolinas Campaign

Commanders

Robert Francis Catterson

See also
 List of Indiana Civil War regiments

References
The Civil War Archive - Indiana Units
National Park Service

External links
 "Virtual Cemetery" of members of Co. F, 97th Indiana Infantry

97
1862 establishments in Indiana
Military units and formations established in 1862
Military units and formations established in 1865